Partial general elections were held in Belgium on 9 June 1863. The result was a victory for the Liberal Party, which won 59 of the 116 seats in the Chamber of Representatives and 33 of the 58 seats in the Senate. Voter turnout was 74.5%, although only 52,519 people were eligible to vote.

Under the alternating system, elections for the Chamber of Representatives were only held in five out of the nine provinces: Antwerp, Brabant, Luxembourg, Namur and West Flanders. Additionally, special elections were held in the arrondissements of Tournai, Ghent and Hasselt.

Results

Chamber of Representatives

Senate

References

1860s elections in Belgium
General
Belgium
Belgium